The Arrondissement of Vendôme is an arrondissement of France, located in the Loir-et-Cher departement, region of Centre-Val de Loire. It has 100 communes.

Composition

The communes of the arrondissement of Vendôme, and their INSEE codes, are:

Ambloy (41001) 
Areines (41003) 
Artins (41004) 
Authon (41007) 
Azé (41010) 
Baillou (41012) 
Beauchêne (41014) 
Bonneveau (41020) 
Bouffry (41022) 
Boursay (41024) 
Brévainville (41026) 
Busloup (41028) 
Cellé (41030) 
La Chapelle-Enchérie (41037) 
La Chapelle-Vicomtesse (41041) 
Chauvigny-du-Perche (41048) 
Choue (41053) 
Cormenon (41060) 
Couëtron-au-Perche (41248) 
Coulommiers-la-Tour (41065) 
Crucheray (41072) 
Danzé (41073) 
Droué (41075) 
Épuisay (41078) 
Les Essarts (41079) 
Faye (41081) 
Fontaine-les-Coteaux (41087) 
Fontaine-Raoul (41088) 
La Fontenelle (41089) 
Fortan (41090) 
Fréteval (41095) 
Le Gault-du-Perche (41096) 
Gombergean (41098) 
Les Hayes (41100) 
Houssay (41102) 
Huisseau-en-Beauce (41103) 
Lancé (41107) 
Lavardin (41113) 
Lignières (41115) 
Lisle (41116) 
Lunay (41120) 
Marcilly-en-Beauce (41124) 
Mazangé (41131) 
Meslay (41138) 
Moisy (41141) 
Mondoubleau (41143) 
Montoire-sur-le-Loir (41149) 
Montrouveau (41153) 
Morée (41154) 
Naveil (41158) 
Nourray (41163) 
Ouzouer-le-Doyen (41172) 
Périgny (41174) 
Pezou (41175) 
Le Plessis-Dorin (41177) 
Le Poislay (41179) 
Pray (41182) 
Prunay-Cassereau (41184) 
Rahart (41186) 
Renay (41187) 
Rocé (41190) 
Les Roches-l'Évêque (41192) 
Romilly (41193) 
Ruan-sur-Egvonne (41196) 
Saint-Amand-Longpré (41199) 
Saint-Arnoult (41201) 
Sainte-Anne (41200) 
Saint-Firmin-des-Prés (41209) 
Saint-Gourgon (41213) 
Saint-Hilaire-la-Gravelle (41214) 
Saint-Jacques-des-Guérets (41215) 
Saint-Jean-Froidmentel (41216) 
Saint-Marc-du-Cor (41224) 
Saint-Martin-des-Bois (41225) 
Saint-Ouen (41226) 
Saint-Rimay (41228) 
Sargé-sur-Braye (41235) 
Sasnières (41236) 
Savigny-sur-Braye (41238) 
Selommes (41243) 
Sougé (41250) 
Le Temple (41254) 
Ternay (41255) 
Thoré-la-Rochette (41259) 
Tourailles (41261) 
Troo (41265) 
Vallée-de-Ronsard (41070) 
Vendôme (41269) 
Villavard (41274) 
La Ville-aux-Clercs (41275) 
Villebout (41277) 
Villechauve (41278) 
Villedieu-le-Château (41279) 
Villemardy (41283) 
Villeporcher (41286) 
Villerable (41287) 
Villeromain (41290) 
Villetrun (41291) 
Villiersfaux (41293) 
Villiers-sur-Loir (41294)

History

The arrondissement of Vendôme was created in 1800. At the January 2017 reorganisation of the arrondissements of Loir-et-Cher, it gained two communes from the arrondissement of Blois, and it lost four communes to the arrondissement of Blois.

As a result of the reorganisation of the cantons of France which came into effect in 2015, the borders of the cantons are no longer related to the borders of the arrondissements. The cantons of the arrondissement of Vendôme were, as of January 2015:

 Droué
 Mondoubleau
 Montoire-sur-le-Loir
 Morée
 Saint-Amand-Longpré
 Savigny-sur-Braye
 Selommes
 Vendôme-1
 Vendôme-2

References

Vendome